Mean Streets is a 1973 American crime film co-written and directed by Martin Scorsese, co-written by Mardik Martin, and starring Harvey Keitel and Robert De Niro. It was released by Warner Bros. on October 2, 1973. De Niro won the National Society of Film Critics and the New York Film Critics Circle award for Best Supporting Actor for his role as "Johnny Boy" Civello.

In 1997, Mean Streets was selected for preservation in the United States National Film Registry by the Library of Congress, who deemed it "culturally, historically, or aesthetically significant".

Plot
Charlie Cappa, a young Italian-American in the Little Italy neighborhood of New York City, is hampered by his feeling of responsibility toward his reckless younger friend John "Johnny Boy" Civello, a small-time gambler and ne'er-do-well who refuses to work and owes money to many loan sharks. Charlie is also having a secret affair with Johnny's cousin Teresa, who has epilepsy and is ostracized because of her condition—especially by Charlie's Uncle Giovanni, a powerful mafioso. Giovanni wants Charlie to distance himself from Johnny, saying "honorable men go with honorable men."

Charlie is torn between his devout Catholicism and his illicit Mafia work for Giovanni. Johnny becomes increasingly self-destructive and disrespectful of his Mafia-connected creditors. Failing to receive redemption in the Church, Charlie seeks it through sacrificing himself on Johnny's behalf. At a bar, a loan shark named Michael comes looking for Johnny to pay up. To his surprise, Johnny insults him. Michael lunges at Johnny, who pulls a gun. After a tense standoff, Michael walks away and Charlie convinces Johnny that they should leave town for a brief period. Teresa insists on coming with them. Charlie borrows a car and they drive off, leaving the neighborhood without incident.

A car that has been following them suddenly pulls up, with Michael at the wheel and his henchman, Jimmy Shorts, in the backseat. Jimmy fires several shots at Charlie's car, hitting Johnny in the neck and Charlie in the hand, causing Charlie to crash the car into a fire hydrant. Johnny is seen in an alleyway staggering toward a white light which is revealed to be a police car. Charlie gets out of the crashed vehicle and kneels in the spurting water from the hydrant, dazed and bleeding. Paramedics take Teresa and Charlie away while Johnny's fate remains unknown.

Cast
 Harvey Keitel as Charlie Cappa
 Robert De Niro as John "Johnny Boy" Civello
 David Proval as Tony DeVienazo
 Amy Robinson as Teresa Ronchelli
 Victor Argo as Mario
 Richard Romanus as Michael Longo
 Cesare Danova as Giovanni Cappa
 George Memmoli as Joey 
 Jeannie Bell as Diane
 Harry Northup as Soldier
 Martin Scorsese as Jimmy Shorts
 David Carradine as Drunk

Production
Apart from his first actual feature, Who's That Knocking at My Door, and a directing project given to him by early independent film maker Roger Corman, Boxcar Bertha, this was Scorsese's first feature film of his own design. Director John Cassavetes told him after he completed Boxcar Bertha: "You’ve just spent a year of your life making a piece of shit." This inspired Scorsese to make a film about his own experiences. Cassavetes told Scorsese he should do something like Who's That Knocking at My Door, which Cassavetes had liked. Mean Streets was based on events Scorsese saw almost regularly while growing up in New York City's Little Italy.

The screenplay began as a continuation of the characters in Who's That Knocking. Scorsese changed the title from Season of the Witch to Mean Streets, a reference to Raymond Chandler's essay "The Simple Art of Murder", where Chandler writes, "But down these mean streets a man must go who is not himself mean, who is neither tarnished nor afraid." Scorsese sent the script to Corman, who agreed to back the film if all the characters were black. Scorsese was anxious to make the film so he considered this option, but actress Verna Bloom arranged a meeting with potential financial backer Jonathan Taplin, the road manager for The Band. Taplin liked the script and was willing to raise the $300,000 Scorsese wanted if Corman promised, in writing, to distribute the film. The blaxploitation suggestion came to nothing when funding from Warner Bros. allowed him to make the film with Italian-American characters.

Reception
The film was well received by most critics; Pauline Kael was among the enthusiastic critics, calling it "a true original, and a triumph of personal filmmaking" and "dizzyingly sensual". Vincent Canby of The New York Times reflected that "no matter how bleak the milieu, no matter how heartbreaking the narrative, some films are so thoroughly, beautifully realized they have a kind of tonic effect that has no relation to the subject matter". Time Out magazine called it "one of the best American films of the decade". David Denby, writing for Sight and Sound, praised the film's acting, saying that Scorsese had used improvisation "better than anyone in American movies so far." He concluded by saying that, "Scorsese's impulse to express all he feels about life in every scene (a cannier, more prudent director wouldn't have started his film with that great De Niro monologue), and thus to wrench his audience upwards into a new state of consciousness with one prolonged and devastating gesture, infinitely hurting and infinitely tender. Mean Streets comes close enough to this feverish ideal to warrant our love and much of our respect."

Retrospectively, Roger Ebert of the Chicago Sun-Times inducted Mean Streets on his Great Movies list and wrote, "In countless ways, right down to the detail of modern TV crime shows, Mean Streets is one of the source points of modern movies." In 2013, the staff of Entertainment Weekly voted the film the seventh greatest of all time. In 2015, it was ranked 93rd on the BBC's list of the 100 greatest American films. James Gandolfini, when asked on Inside the Actors Studio (season 11, episode two) which films most influenced him, cited Mean Streets, saying "I saw that 10 times in a row." Likewise, director Kathryn Bigelow said that Mean Streets was one of her five favorite movies. In an interview with GQ Magazine, Spike Lee named Mean Streets as one of his influences, along with On The Waterfront. In 2011, Empire Magazine listed the film as #1 on its "50 Greatest American Independent Films" list.
In 2022 the film appeared on "Variety's 100 Greatest Films of All Time" list.

On Rotten Tomatoes, the film holds an approval rating of 96% based on 67 reviews, with an average rating of 8.90/10. The website's critics consensus reads: "Mean Streets is a powerful tale of urban sin and guilt that marks Scorsese's arrival as an important cinematic voice and features electrifying performances from Harvey Keitel and Robert De Niro." According to Metacritic, which assigned a weighted average of 96 out of 100 based on 11 critics, the film received "universal acclaim".

Home media
Mean Streets was released on VHS and Betamax in 1985. The film debuted as a letterboxed LaserDisc on October 7, 1991 in the US. It was released on Blu-ray on April 6, 2011 in France, and in America on July 17, 2012. The home media releases use the original mono audio track, rather than a modern surround sound mix as is common even for films that originally had mono audio. A May 18, 2015 release in the UK altered the color timing, and included a lossless stereo audio track.

See also
 Goncharov (meme) - Internet meme originating in the early 2020s about a fictional Scorsese film made in 1973.
 List of American films of 1973

References

External links

 
 
 
 

1973 films
1973 crime drama films
1970s American films
1970s English-language films
American crime drama films
American neo-noir films
Films about Catholicism
Films about the American Mafia
Films directed by Martin Scorsese
1973 independent films
Films set in New York City
Films shot in New York City
Films with screenplays by Martin Scorsese
United States National Film Registry films
Warner Bros. films